Andrea Suárez may refer to:
 Andrea Suárez (beauty pageant contestant)
 Andrea Suárez (singer)